Brüggen is a municipality in the district of Viersen, in North Rhine-Westphalia, Germany. It is situated near the border with the Netherlands, on the river Schwalm, approx. 15 km south of Venlo and 20 km north-west of Mönchengladbach.

Division of the town
Brüggen consists of 3 subdivisions
 Brüggen
 Born
 Bracht

Mayors 
 Frank Gellen (CDU): since 2014
 Gerhard Gottwald: 1989–2014

Sights 

 Brüggen Castle
 Natural History Museum (Naturkundemuseum): since 1979 Brüggen Castle has been home to a regional hunting and natural history museum with a nature park information point.
 Schwalmpforte, a former town gate
 St. Nicholas' Church
 Old Abbey of the Knights of the Cross (Kreuzherrenkloster)
 Born Mill (Borner Mühle)
 Brüggen Mill (Brüggener Mühle)
 Schloss Dilborn
 Old toll house with Rentei (~treasury)
 Nature and Wildlife Park (Natur und Tierpark Brüggen)
 New Jewish Cemetery
 Old Jewish Cemetery

Climate
Climate in this area has mild differences between highs and lows, and there is adequate rainfall year-round.  The Köppen Climate Classification subtype for this climate is "Cfb" (Marine West Coast Climate/Oceanic climate).

See also
 Royal Air Force Station Brüggen

Personalities 

 Karl Prinz zu Löwenstein-Wertheim-Rosenberg, (born 1952), chairman of the managing board of the German "Malteser Hilfsdienst"
 Simon Jentzsch (born 1976), footballer

References

Viersen (district)